Catherine Procaccia (born 13 October 1949) is a member of the Senate of France, representing the Val-de-Marne department.  She is a member of the Union for a Popular Movement.

References
Page on the Senate website

1949 births
Living people
The Republicans (France) politicians
French Senators of the Fifth Republic
French people of Italian descent
Women members of the Senate (France)
21st-century French women politicians
Senators of Val-de-Marne
Politicians from Paris
Sciences Po alumni